Donald Barclay Howard (27 January 1953 – 19 May 2008) was a Scottish amateur golfer. He was regarded as one of the finest golfers of his time and considered a folk-hero. He has had a lifetime relationship with Cochrane Castle Golf Club in Johnstone, Renfrewshire.

Life
Howard was born in Glasgow. He was married when he was 19, the marriage to Alexandra Lawson Brennan produced two daughters – Linda (b. 1972) and Lorraine (b. 1976).

Howard first joined Clydesdale Bank and later switched to Rolls-Royce, where he was made redundant in 1993. After that he became a full-time amateur golfer, that and his previous success on the golf course led him to a job in customer relations with club-maker John Letters.

Howard was a self-confessed alcoholic, leading to international exclusion in 1984. After having suffered and defeated leukemia, he died of pneumonia in 2008.

Howard was a lifelong friend of Sam Torrance, who became a successful professional golfer.

Sporting career
Howard can probably be best described as a true amateur. Working a regular work week and playing golf in his spare time. He might have been a top professional. He was a leading figure in Scottish and British amateur golf. Over the years he has won more than a hundred amateur tournaments.

Howard played on the Great Britain and Ireland team in the Walker Cup twice, winning in 1995 at Royal Portcawl. He has also played on the GB&I team in the Eisenhower Trophy in 1996. He was the low amateur in the 1997 Open Championship.

In his latter years, Howard was a leading figure in the Scottish Golf Union.

Autobiography
Howard published an autobiography (with Jonathan Russell) in 2001 called "Out of the rough" (not to be confused with Laura Baugh's book called "Out of the Rough" or John Daly's: "My life in and out of the rough") where he describes his personal battles (against alcohol) and his inner demons.

Amateur wins
this list is incomplete
1994 St Andrews Links Trophy
1996 St Andrews Links Trophy
1997 Scottish Amateur Stroke Play Championship

Team appearances
Amateur
St Andrews Trophy (representing Great Britain & Ireland): 1980 (winners), 1994 (winners), 1996 (winners)
Walker Cup (representing Great Britain & Ireland): 1995 (winners), 1997
Eisenhower Trophy (representing Great Britain & Ireland): 1996
European Amateur Team Championship (representing Scotland): 1995 (winners), 1997

References

External links
Obituary in The Herald
Cochrane Castle Golf Club website

Scottish male golfers
Amateur golfers
Golfers from Glasgow
1953 births
2008 deaths